The 2018 Southeastern Conference women's basketball tournament was the postseason women's basketball tournament for the Southeastern Conference held at Bridgestone Arena in Nashville, Tennessee, from February 28 through March 4, 2018. South Carolina defeated the regular-season champions Mississippi State to earn an automatic bid to the 2018 NCAA Women's Division I Basketball Tournament.

Seeds

Schedule

Source:

Bracket
 All times are Central

See also

2018 SEC men's basketball tournament

References

External links
 

2017–18 Southeastern Conference women's basketball season
SEC women's basketball tournament
Basketball competitions in Nashville, Tennessee
Women's sports in Tennessee
College sports tournaments in Tennessee
SEC Women's Basketball